Without You I'm Nothing is a 1990 American musical comedy film directed by John Boskovich and starring and written by comedian and singer Sandra Bernhard, based on material from her award-winning one-woman show of the same name, which was produced by Terry Danuser.

The film was shot on location in August 1989 at The Coconut Grove in the Ambassador Hotel in Los Angeles. Karole Armitage was the choreographer. The film recreates moments from the stage show, often with Bernhard dressed in zany costumes reminiscent of the character she is embodying without actually "becoming" that character. Interspersed are faux-interview bits with actress Lu Leonard as Bernhard's manager and actor Steve Antin, with whom she would later co-star in the film Inside Monkey Zetterland.

The film is notorious for a finale in which Bernhard wears nothing but pasties and an extremely skimpy G-string (in an American Flag print) and proceeds to go-go dance to the song "Little Red Corvette" by Prince. It was not a commercial success, but it was highly praised by critics for its caustic commentary on American values and celebrity culture.

In Bernhard's 2006 Off-Broadway show Everything Bad & Beautiful, she concludes by showing the final footage from this film: Cynthia Bailey writing "Fuck Sandra Bernhard" on a tablecloth in lipstick.

Home media
Without You I'm Nothing was released on VHS video cassette on December 19, 1990 and became a cult classic, prompting it to be re-released (again on VHS) in 2000 as part of the "MGM Avant-Garde Cinema" collection.
It was released on DVD on August 23, 2005.
2022 it was added into the Criterion Collection with other classics.

External links

1990 films
1990s satirical films
1990s musical comedy films
American satirical films
American musical comedy films
American films based on plays
1990 comedy films
Films shot in Los Angeles
1990s English-language films
1990s American films